Aidan Joseph Maloney (August 12, 1920 – March 16, 2018) was a Canadian politician and executive. He represented the electoral district of Ferryland in the Newfoundland and Labrador House of Assembly from 1966 to 1971. Maloney also served in cabinet as Minister of Fisheries, and as Community & Social Development. He was a member of the Liberal Party of Newfoundland and Labrador. Born in King's Cove, he was a business executive. Maloney died in March 2018 at the age of 97.

References

1920 births
2018 deaths
Liberal Party of Newfoundland and Labrador MHAs